Pamela Jackson is a Christian writer, public speaker and novelist.

Born in Atlanta, Georgia, and raised in Alpharetta, Georgia, Jackson obtained a B.A. in Communication Arts and Philosophy from the University of Maryland. Her talent for words began there, where she interned as a speech writer. After graduation, Jackson wrote copy for an advertising agency in Atlanta.

In mid-life Jackson went into ministry, becoming a Certified Candidate as a Local Pastor in the United Methodist Church. She concentrated her efforts in Hispanic ministry and teaching.

Jackson writes fiction and poetry. She is the recipient of the Georgia Author of the Year Award, and a member of The International Women's Writing Guild.

On This Side of Heaven, Jackson's first novel, follows the journey of a corrupt preacher in a fast-growing affluent suburb who is determined to build a mega church, at any cost.  Jackson has written a series of books in the Heavenly Novels series: On This Side of Heaven (2006), For the Love of Heaven (2007), with several other Heavenly Novels completed and slated for future release. Beyond the Cross, a book about Sanctification, was published in 2007.

Jackson cites her influences as Old Testament literature, including writings that were never canonized, F. Scott Fitzgerald, C. S. Lewis and Sue Monk Kidd. Jackson lives on a farm outside Atlanta. She is a member of Alpharetta First United Methodist Church.

External links
 Official website

1964 births
Living people
American writers
American women writers
21st-century American women